Brighton is a home rule municipality city located in Adams and Weld counties, Colorado, United States. Brighton is the county seat of Adams County and a part of the Denver–Aurora–Lakewood, CO Metropolitan Statistical Area and the Front Range Urban Corridor. The city population was 40,083 at the 2020 United States Census with 39,718 residing in Adams County and 365 residing in Weld County.

History
The town was named for Brighton Beach, New York. Brighton was founded in the 1870s as a stage/railroad depot and farming community. The town was originally named Hughes Station.
The town was incorporated in 1887. Among the notable scholars born there are Richard Ling, founding editor of Mobile Media & Communication, currently the Shaw Foundation Professor of Media Technology at Nanyang Technological University, and Max Pfeffer, Senior Associate Dean of the Cornell University College of Agriculture and Life Sciences.

Michael Martinez serves as the current city manager.

Geography
Brighton is a suburb of Denver.

At the 2020 United States Census, the city had a total area of  including  of water.

Climate

According to the Köppen Climate Classification system, Brighton has a cold semi-arid climate, abbreviated "BSk" on climate maps.

Demographics

As of the census of 2000, there were 20,905 people, 6,718 households, and 5,058 families living in the city. The racial makeup of the city was 76.91% White, 0.99% African American, 1.47% Native American, 1.10% Asian, 0.04% Pacific Islander, 16.29% from other races, and 3.20% from two or more races. Hispanic or Latino of any race were 38.22% of the population.

There were 6,718 households, out of which 40.2% had children under the age of 18 living with them, 58.6% were married couples living together, 11.9% had a female householder with no husband present, and 24.7% were non-families. 19.7% of all households were made up of individuals, and 8.5% had someone living alone who was 65 years of age or older. The average household size was 2.92 and the average family size was 3.34.

In the city, the age distribution of the population shows 28.6% under the age of 18, 10.1% from 18 to 24, 32.7% from 25 to 44, 18.8% from 45 to 64, and 9.7% who were 65 years of age or older. The median age was 32 years. For every 100 females, there were 108.0 males. For every 100 females age 18 and over, there were 108.3 males.

The median income for a household in the city was $46,779, and the median income for a family was $53,286. Males had a median income of $35,686 versus $27,103 for females. The per capita income for the city was $17,927. About 6.1% of families and 9.4% of the population were below the poverty line, including 11.0% of those under age 18 and 8.6% of those age 65 or over.

Economy
Brighton is the home of two Vestas manufacturing plants, a wind turbine blade factory and a nacelle manufacturing plant. The factories are valued at $290 million and will provide 1,350 employment opportunities: 650 in the blade factory and another 700 in the nacelle manufacturing plant. Groundbreaking for the factories took place on March 25, 2009.

The Prairie Center is a  shopping center with a pedestrian-oriented retail village, which is anchored by JC Penney, Kohl's, Dick's Sporting Goods, Super Target, and many other stores.

The Greater Brighton Chamber of Commerce and Tourism Bureau began helping small businesses in the Brighton community in 1955, paving the way for the expansion of Brighton retail, and manufacturing. The Brighton Chamber helped to secure Brighton as an Agritourism destination within the Denver Metro area for Farm Fresh Produce and opening the Brighton Visitors Center in May 2020. The Greater Brighton Chamber of Commerce is ranked the 14th Best Chamber in the Denver area per the Denver Business Journal.

Education
School District 27J serves the community.

Notable people
Notable individuals who were born in or have lived in Brighton include:
 Todd Helton (1973- ), baseball 1st baseman
 John L. Kane Jr. (1937- ), U.S. federal judge
 Dillon Serna (1994- ), soccer midfielder
 Angie Zapata (1989-2008), murder victim
Brian Shaw, leading American strongman, placed first in the 2011, 2013, 2015 and 2016 World's Strongest Man competitions.

Sister city
Brighton has a sister city, as designated by Sister Cities International:
  Ziębice, Lower Silesian Voivodeship, Poland

See also

Colorado
Bibliography of Colorado
Index of Colorado-related articles
Outline of Colorado
List of counties in Colorado
List of municipalities in Colorado
List of places in Colorado
List of statistical areas in Colorado
Front Range Urban Corridor
North Central Colorado Urban Area
Denver-Aurora, CO Combined Statistical Area
Denver-Aurora-Lakewood, CO Metropolitan Statistical Area
Greeley, CO Metropolitan Statistical Area

References

External links

City of Brighton website
CDOT map of the City of Brighton

Cities in Adams County, Colorado
Cities in Weld County, Colorado
Cities in Colorado
Populated places established in 1887
County seats in Colorado
Denver metropolitan area